Hameur Bouazza (born 22 February 1985) is an Algerian former professional footballer who usually played as a left winger but could also play on the right.

Bouazza spent most of his football career in England, having also played in Turkey, France, Cyprus, Spain, Algeria and Tunisia.

An Algerian international between 2007 and 2013, Bouazza played for his country in two editions of the Africa Cup of Nations: 2010 in Angola and 2013 in South Africa. As of May 2015, he has 21 caps and 3 goals.

Background
Bouazza was born in Évry, France, where he lived with his parents, two brothers and two sisters. In October 2005, speaking about his early life, Bouazza said: "Sometimes I didn't go to school because all that I wanted was to play football. It was football, football. I started playing at nine and when I was 15 I got a chance with Auxerre. It did not go well and after a year I returned to Évry."

Club career

Watford
In 2003, at the age of 16, Bouazza moved to England having won a scholarship at Watford following a trial.

He made his first team debut as an 88th-minute substitute on 7 February 2004 in a 2–2 with Sunderland at Vicarage Road. A week later, he scored on his full debut, a 2–0 home win over Preston North End. He made a total of nine appearances in the 2003–04 season. The following season, he made 28 league and eight cup appearances, scoring three goals. During the 2005–06 season, Bouazza was overshadowed by Darius Henderson, Marlon King, and Ashley Young and missed a lengthy spell with a broken metatarsal but still tallied three goals in nineteen games, one of which was the fourth in Watford's 4–1 win over Championship runners-Up Sheffield United.

On 6 October 2005, Bouazza was loaned out to League One side Swindon Town, initially for one month, but later extended to the end of the year. He scored three goals in 15 games for Swindon.

Bouazza broke his metatarsal during a Watford home game against Derby County on 4 March 2006, and had the bone pinned in an operation. On 21 May 2006, he played in Watford's 3–0 win over Leeds United in the Championship play-off final at the Millennium Stadium, Cardiff, coming on as a 72nd-minute substitute.

Throughout the 2006–07 season, with Watford in the Premier League, Bouazza started most league games, principally as a left-sided winger, scoring five goals and winning the club's "Young Player of the Season award".

He made a total of 100 appearances for The Hornets in four years, scoring 13 goals.

Fulham
On 8 August 2007, Bouazza joined Premier League side Fulham on a four-year deal for an initial fee of £3m (potentially rising to £4m, depending on appearances and Fulham's divisional status).

Bouazza started out the season strongly making his debut in a 1–2 defeat to Arsenal on 12 August. However, after just three appearances he dislocated his shoulder in a 1–2 defeat to Middlesbrough on 18 August. He returned to the Fulham starting XI after a couple of weeks out, and scored his first Fulham goal with a close-range free kick against Manchester City in a 3–3 draw at Craven Cottage on 22 September 2007. He made a total of 22 appearances for Fulham in the 2007–08 season, scoring one goal.

On 9 August 2008 he signed for Championship side Charlton Athletic on a season-long loan, making his debut later that day as an 83rd-minute substitute in a 3–0 win over Swansea City at The Valley. He scored his first goal for the Addicks on 23 August in a 4–2 home win over Reading.

On 8 January 2009, after a total of 27 appearances and four goals at Charlton, Fulham activated a recall clause in the loan agreement and immediately loaned him to another Championship side, Birmingham City, for the remainder of the season.

Bouazza made his Birmingham debut in their next league game, a 1–1 draw at home to Cardiff City on 17 January, and scored his first goal, a clever finish after a defensive error, in a 2–0 win over Doncaster Rovers at the Keepmoat Stadium on 14 March.

He made a total of 16 appearances for the Blues, helping them win promotion to the Premier League as runners-up to champions, Wolverhampton Wanderers.

Sivasspor
On 18 August 2009 Bouazza signed for Turkish Süper Lig side Sivasspor. However, his stay in Sivas was short lived, lasting only five days. He played one game for the club, a 3–0 home defeat to Shahktar Donetsk in the Europa League play-off round.

On 23 August, he left Sivasspor, stating that he did not wish to remain in Turkey, and agreeing a mutual termination of his contract. Sivasspor head-coach Bulent Uygun said they had to release Bouazza as they didn't want him to damage the morale of the team.

Blackpool
On 31 August Sky Sports reported that Bouazza was in talks with Championship side Blackpool. The following day it was confirmed that he had signed a one-year contract with an option for a further year. He made his debut on 12 September as a 73rd-minute substitute in a 2–1 defeat to Leicester City at the Walkers Stadium. He made his full debut four days later in the Seasiders' 2–1 win over Newcastle United at Bloomfield Road. His first goal came on 26 September, in a 2–0 home win over Peterborough United, when he nutmegged defender Tom Williams before curling the ball into the net from a tight angle.

In January 2010, Bouazza's goal against Peterborough was voted by Blackpool supporters the best goal of 2009, and so became the club's nominated goal for the Goal of the Year at the annual Football League Awards to be held on 14 March. He missed the whole of January, while he was away in the Africa Cup of Nations in Angola. However, on his return to Blackpool in early February it was discovered that he had picked up an injury in the tournament, believed to be a hernia. His return to action came on 16 February as an 81st-minute substitute in the 2–0 home win over Middlesbrough, when he set up D. J. Campbell to score Blackpool's second goal in injury time. He was released at the end of the season.

Millwall
On 28 January 2011, Bouazza was loaned out by AC Arles-Avignon to Millwall until the end of the season. Bouazza made his debut for Millwall on 19 February. He came on as a substitute and scored a curling free-kick after being on the field for only 10 minutes, in a 3–2 home defeat to Middlesbrough. Millwall completed the permanent signing of Bouazza on 19 April on a two-year contract, for a fee believed to be in the region of €100,000.

AC Omonia
On 22 June 2012, Bouazza signed for Cypriot First Division side AC Omonia on a one-year deal, despite having initially rejected a contract offer from the club. However, he left the club in August, having only been in Cyprus for a few weeks.

Racing Santander
In September 2012, Bouazza moved to Spain, joining Segunda División side Racing Santander. In December, following a 1–0 defeat against Sabadell, Bouazza was chased by three masked men, leading to a confrontation outside of his home. He left the club after his contract expired at the end of the season, and had a trial with Scottish side Rangers in the summer of 2013.

Later career
In December 2013 he made his debut for Algerian side ES Sétif and made three further appearances before leaving to join Championnat National team Red Star. He appeared in 80 matches and scored 20 goals across three seasons, with the majority coming in Ligue 2 following Red Star's promotion in Bouazza's debut season. In January 2017, Bouazza joined Tunisian Ligue Professionnelle 1 side Étoile du Sahel.

International career

Early career
Although born in France, Bouazza was approached by the Algerian Football Federation, to play at national level for them. Bouazza accepted, explaining later: "I grew up in Paris, yes, but I've always known my nationality. I am Algerian, just as my father and mother are. My grandmother lives just outside Algiers, and I have many cousins there."

Bouazza made his debut for Algeria against Libya on 7 February 2007 and scored his first goal in a 3–2 victory over Mali on 20 November 2007.

2010 World Cup and 2010 Africa Cup of Nations qualification
Bouazza played in Algeria's opening second round qualification game for the 2010 World Cup, a 1–0 loss to Senegal on 31 May 2008 at the Stade Leopold Senghor, Dakar, Senegal, coming on as a second-half substitute. However, he didn't make any further appearances as Algeria won group Six and progressed to the third round. He then played in the opening third round game, a 0–0 draw with Rwanda at the Stade Amahoro, Kigali, Rwanda on 28 March 2009, again as a substitute. He continued to be used as a second-half substitute in Algeria's next three qualifying games, a 3–1 win over Egypt on 7 June, a 2–0 away win over Zambia on 20 June and a 1–0 home win over Zambia on 6 September, a result which booked Algeria a place at the 2010 Africa Cup of Nations.

On 13 November, as the Algerian squad arrived in Cairo for their vital World Cup qualifier against Egypt the following day, their team bus was attacked by stone-throwers. Three players were injured by flying glass, although Bouazza himself was not. Speaking later about the attack, Bouazza said: "I had a very bad feeling when we landed at the airport because there was no security. And when our coach was attacked on the road from the airport to the city, it was the most terrifying experience of my life. People threw rocks at us, and there was nobody to stop them. Some of the players were hit by flying glass and I only escaped because I was lying on the floor. That is no way to prepare for a World Cup match."

2010 Africa Cup of Nations finals
In January 2010 Bouazza was in the Algeria squad at the Africa Cup of Nations finals in Angola, as they reached the semi-finals; finishing the tournament in 4th place.

He was a second-half substitute in Algeria's first two Group A matches at the Estádio 11 de Novembro in Luanda, a 0–3 defeat to Malawi on 11 January, and a 1–0 victory over Mali, three days later. His first start in the tournament came in Algeria's final group game, a 0–0 draw with Angola on 18 January at the same venue; a result which saw Algeria qualify for the quarter finals.

On 24 January Bouazza scored the winning goal against Ivory Coast, to ensure Algeria qualified for the semi-finals. Just two minutes after coming on as a substitute at the start of extra time, with the scores level at 2–2, Bouazza's headed goal gave Algeria the lead and with it a 3–2 victory. Four days later he was an unused substitute as Algeria lost their semi-final 0–4 to North African rivals Egypt, but started the 3rd place play-off on 30 January, which they lost 0–1 to Nigeria at the Ombaka National Stadium in Benguela. He made a total of five appearances in the tournament in Angola, three of them as a substitute.

Personal life
Bouazza is a practising Muslim. He observes ramadan each year, fasting during daylight hours for a month. He has admitted fasting can be hard, but said it was part of his faith. "I'm proud to be a Muslim. I'm not going to say (combining fasting and football) is easy. Ramadan is hard, and I try to do my best every time. You know God is there to help us, we believe in Him. We just need to pray and believe in Him."

Career statistics

Club

International

Scores and results list Algeria's goal tally first, score column indicates score after each Bouazza goal.

References

External links
 
 

1985 births
Living people
People from Évry, Essonne
Footballers from Essonne
Association football wingers
Algerian footballers
Algeria international footballers
Algerian Muslims
2010 Africa Cup of Nations players
2013 Africa Cup of Nations players
French footballers
Premier League players
Ligue 1 players
Ligue 2 players
Championnat National players
Segunda División players
Algerian Ligue Professionnelle 1 players
Watford F.C. players
Swindon Town F.C. players
Fulham F.C. players
Charlton Athletic F.C. players
Birmingham City F.C. players
Blackpool F.C. players
Millwall F.C. players
Sivasspor footballers
Racing de Santander players
ES Sétif players
Évry FC players
Red Star F.C. players
Étoile Sportive du Sahel players
FC Fleury 91 players
French sportspeople of Algerian descent
Algerian expatriate footballers
Expatriate footballers in England
Expatriate footballers in Turkey
Expatriate footballers in Spain
Expatriate footballers in Tunisia
Algerian expatriate sportspeople in England
Algerian expatriate sportspeople in Turkey
Algerian expatriate sportspeople in Cyprus
Algerian expatriate sportspeople in Spain